Rachid Belkacem (1973 – July 5, 2006) was a Dutch national, and a suspected member of the terrorist organisation Hofstad Network. He was never convicted in court. His nickname was Abu Fadel, he was a friend of Mohammed Bouyeri, the murderer of Dutch filmmaker Theo van Gogh.

Belkacem was arrested in Whitechapel, London on 22 June 2005 on request of the Dutch authorities. Belkacems name arose in an investigation about people smuggling in the Dutch province of Zeeland. He was extradited on 2 August 2005. He was charged with being a member of a terrorist organisation. In addition he was charged with recruiting for armed struggle, several firearms offences and forging documents. Belkacem allegedly helped Redouan al-Issar, spiritual leader of the Hofstad Network, flee the Netherlands on the day of the murder of Theo van Gogh.

Belkacem was released provisionally in March 2006, because the public prosecutor deemed an eventual conviction for membership of a terrorist organisation highly unlikely. In April he was acquitted of the illegal possession of a firearm.

In July 2006, Belkacem was found dead in his house in Zierikzee. Friends and family claimed he was poisoned. Police investigated the circumstances of his death.

In August 2008, Belkacem's mother was remarried to his then significant other.

References

 

Dutch Islamists
Islamic terrorism in the Netherlands
Hofstad Network
Dutch people of Moroccan descent
Dutch prisoners and detainees
Prisoners and detainees of the Netherlands
Muslims with branch missing
2006 deaths
1973 births
People extradited from the United Kingdom
People extradited to the Netherlands
People imprisoned on charges of terrorism